The Republic of the Congo competed at the 2000 Summer Olympics in Sydney, Australia.

Athletics

Men
Track and road events

Women
Track and road events

Judo

Men

Swimming

Men

Women

References
Official Olympic Reports

External links
 

Nations at the 2000 Summer Olympics
2000
2000 in the Republic of the Congo sport